The 1952–53 Bradford City A.F.C. season was the 40th in the club's history.

The club finished 16th in Division Three North, and reached the 2nd round of the FA Cup.

Sources

References

Bradford City A.F.C. seasons
Bradford City